The Burg Fürstenberg is a castle in the municipality of Oberdiebach in Rhineland-Palatinate, Germany. When the castle was built, in 1219, this part of the small (2000 acres) Oberdiebach was the village of Rheindiebach.

Notes and references

Sources and external links

Furstenberg (Rheindiebach)
Buildings and structures in Mainz-Bingen
Electoral Palatinate